Nikuštak is a village in the municipality of Lipkovo, North Macedonia.

Demographics 
As of the 2021 census, Nikuštak had 1,572 residents with the following ethnic composition:
Albanians 1,536
Persons for whom data are taken from administrative sources 36

According to the 2002 census, the village had a total of 1,748 inhabitants. Ethnic groups in the village include:
Albanians  1,744
Macedonians 1
Others 3

References

External links

Villages in Lipkovo Municipality
Albanian communities in North Macedonia